
Dardanos may refer to:

Greek mythology
 Dardanus (son of Zeus), the son of Zeus and Electra, and ancestor of the Trojans
 Dardanus (Scythian king), a Scythian king, and the father of Idaea who was the wife of King Phineus
 , mythical ancestor of Dardani
 Dardanus, the Trojan son of Bias, killed by Achilles
 Dardanus, son of Sophalexios and Lysimache, a daughter of King Priam of Troy

People
 Dardanus of Athens (c. 100 BC), Stoic philosopher

Other
 Dardanus (city), an ancient city on the coast of the Hellespont
 Treaty of Dardanos, signed in Dardanos

See also
 Dardanus (disambiguation)
 Dardan (disambiguation)